Ateuchus benitojuarezi, is a species of dung beetle belonging to the family Scarabaeidae. It is found from three locations of the region of Los Chimalapas, Mexico.

Etymology
The scientific name benitojuarezi, is in honor of Benito Juárez, the first indigenous president of Mexico.

Description
Show slight sexual dimorphism. Male is about 7.9mm in length. Body elongate-oval and convex. A glossy black beetle with reddish to greenish sheen. Female is similar, but has a less convex pygidium and more acute clypeal teeth when comparing male.

References

Scarabaeinae
Beetles described in 2018